Andrena palpalis is a species of mining bees in the family Andrenidae. It is found in Central America and North America.

References

Further reading

 

palpalis